The 2002–03 Arkansas Razorbacks men's basketball team represented the University of Arkansas in the 2002–03 college basketball season. The head coach was Stan Heath, serving for his first year. The team played its home games in Bud Walton Arena in Fayetteville, Arkansas.

Schedule

|-

|-
!colspan=9| 2003 SEC men's basketball tournament

Source:

References

Arkansas
Arkansas Razorbacks men's basketball seasons
Razor
Razor